Goldie Sellers (January 9, 1942 – March 28, 2020) was an American football defensive back in the American Football League. Sellers played collegiately at Grambling State University under coach Eddie Robinson. As a professional, he played four seasons as a cornerback for the Denver Broncos (1966–1967) and the Kansas City Chiefs (1968–1969). Sellers was a member of the Chiefs' Super Bowl IV-winning squad. He died on March 28, 2020 from cancer.

's NFL off-season, Goldie Sellers held at least 2 Broncos franchise records, including:
 Kick Return TDs: career (2; with Trindon Holliday), and season (2 in 1966)

See also
 List of American Football League players

References

External links
 Never Before, Never Again: The Autobiography of Eddie Robinson (p. 125-6): 

1942 births
2020 deaths
American football cornerbacks
Denver Broncos (AFL) players
Grambling State Tigers football players
Kansas City Chiefs players
People from Winnsboro, Louisiana
Players of American football from Louisiana
American Football League players